The Changan CX20 is a mini MPV produced by Changan Automobile.

Overview
Pricing for the CX20 starts at 49,900 yuan and ends at 70,900 yuan with a 1.3 liter four-cylinder engine producing 86hp. A facelifted CX20 was revealed during the 2013 Shanghai Auto Show with a new 1.4 liter engine producing 101hp and prices ranging from 55,900 yuan to 64,900 yuan.

CX20 Cross
The Changan CX20 Cross is a crossover version of the regular Changan CX20. It debuted during the 2010 Chongqing Auto Show in Chongqing, China, where Changan Automobile's headquarters is based.

Gallery

References

External links

Official website

CX20
Mini MPVs
Cars of China
Cars introduced in 2010
2010s cars